Laurel School District is a diminutive, rural, public school district located in Lawrence County, Pennsylvania. The District encompasses approximately 66 square miles. Scott Township, Slippery Rock Township, and Hickory Township are within district boundaries. According to 2010 federal census data, it serves a resident population of 8,107. In 2009, the district residents’ per capita income was $17,192, while the median family income was $46,306. In the Commonwealth, the median family income was $49,501 and the United States median family income was $49,445, in 2010.

Laurel School District operates one elementary school and a combined junior–senior high school.

Extracurriculars
The Laurel School District offers a wide variety of clubs, activities and an extensive sports program.

Sports
The District funds:

Boys
Baseball - V, 9th  AA
Basketball - V, 9th AA
Cross Country - AA
Football - V, 9th  A
Golf - AA
Track and Field - AA
Wrestling - AA

Girls
Basketball - V, 9th AA
Cross Country - AAA
Golf - AA
Softball - V, 9th AA
Track and Field - AA
Volleyball - A

Junior High School Sports

Boys
Basketball
Cross Country
Football
Track and Field
Wrestling	

Girls
Basketball
Cross Country
Track and Field
Volleyball 

According to PIAA directory July 2012

References

School districts in Lawrence County, Pennsylvania